The third season of the Mexican television series ¿Quién es la máscara? premiered on Las Estrellas on October 10, 2021. On December 19, 2021, Apache (Actor and singer Kalimba) was declared the winner, and Gitana (Actress and singer Gala Montes) the runner-up.

Panelists and host 

Singer Yuri, singer Carlos Rivera, and social media influencer Juanpa Zurita returned as panelists. Consuelo Duval did not return as a panelist and was replaced by Mónica Huarte. Omar Chaparro did not return as host and was replaced by season 1 panelist Adrián Uribe.

Throughout the season, various guest panelists appeared as the fifth panelist in the panel for one episode. These guest panelists included former host Omar Chaparro (episode 1), season 1 winner Vadhir Derbez (episode 4), season 2 winner María León (episode 5), actress Erika Buenfil (episode 6), and season 3 contestant Lorena Herrera (episode 7).

Contestants 
This season features a non-contestant masked character called Hombre de Piedra (Stone Man), beginning in the seventh episode and ending in the tenth episode where they were unmasked to be revealed as singer Gloria Trevi.

Episodes

Week 1 (October 10) 
 Guest performance: "Las Locuras Mías" performed by Omar Chaparro featuring Joey Montana

Week 2 (October 17)

Week 3 (October 24)

Week 4 (October 31) 
 Group Performance: "Ghostbusters" by Ray Parker Jr.

Week 5 (November 7)

Week 6 (November 14)

Week 7 (November 21) 
 Guest performance: "I Love Rock 'n' Roll" by Joan Jett & the Blackhearts performed by Hombre de Piedra

Week 8 (November 28) 
 Guest performance: "Hoy Tengo Ganas de Ti" by Alejandro Fernández & Christina Aguilera performed by Hombre de Piedra

Week 9 (December 5) 
Guest performance: "Vente Pa' Ca" by Ricky Martin feat. Maluma performed by Hombre de Piedra

Week 10 (December 19) 
 Group performance: "Carnaval" by Maluma performed by Hombre de Piedra
 Third place performance: "El Listón de tu pelo" by Los Ángeles Azules performed by La Hueva
 Guest performance: "Ensayando Cómo Pedirte Perdón" performed by Gloria Trevi

Ratings

Notes

References 

2021 Mexican television seasons
¿Quién es la máscara? (Mexican TV series)